Jean-Patrick Wakanumuné (born 13 March 1980) is a New Caledonian international footballer who plays as a defender for AS Mont-Dore in the New Caledonia Division Honneur and the New Caledonia national team.

Personal life
His brother is also a footballer, Joël Wakanumuné, who is an international as well.

References

1980 births
Living people
New Caledonian footballers
New Caledonia international footballers
Association football defenders
AS Magenta players
Hienghène Sport players
AS Mont-Dore players
2008 OFC Nations Cup players
2012 OFC Nations Cup players